Tidelands are the territory between the tide line of sea coasts, and lands lying under the sea beyond the low-water limit of the tide, considered within the territorial waters of a nation. The United States Constitution does not specify whether ownership of these lands rests with the federal government or with individual states. Originally little commercial value was attached to tidelands, so ownership was never firmly established, but the coastal states generally proceeded as if they were the owners.  Some states, such as Mississippi, directly administer these lands under the public trust doctrine.

The question arose for federal nations whether the tidelands for formerly independent coastal states had been ceded to the federal union on admission, or retained. The admission of the former Republic of Texas as a state in the United States in 1845 stipulated that its tidelands remained the territory of Texas. This has been an issue for oil and natural gas leases and federally funded development that affects such tidelands.

For other states that were formerly independent, such as the Thirteen Colonies, there was no explicit retention of state sovereignty and the federal government had long asserted its own sovereignty over their tidelands.

20th century incidentals
The value of tidelands increased when it became known that vast oil and natural gas deposits lay within their limits and that modern technology made retrieval of these minerals commercially profitable. The first offshore oil well in the Gulf of Mexico began production in 1938 in shallow water one mile (1.6 km) off the Louisiana coast; in 1947, a second well began to operate off the coast of Terrebonne Parish, also in Louisiana.

United States v. California was filed by the Federal government against California in 1946.  On 23 June 1947, the Supreme Court of the United States decided against California. The decision meant the loss of untold millions of dollars in taxes and leasing fees by the states. The states whose tidelands were thought to contain minerals objected strongly to the decision.

The issue became important in the 1952 presidential campaign. The Republican candidate, Dwight D. Eisenhower, pledged legislation that would restore the tidelands to the states. Eisenhower won the election, and, in 1953, Congress passed two acts that fulfilled his campaign promise. The Submerged Lands Act extended state ownership to three geographical miles (almost exactly ) from their actual coastline, or further if a state could establish the existence of a boundary in judicial proceedings. The Outer Continental Shelf Lands Act gave the United States paramount rights from the point where state ownership leaves off to the point where international waters begin.

The 1953 acts did not end all controversy, however. The Submerged Lands Act, in particular, was so badly drawn up that state taxes and leasing fees had to be put in escrow, pending final resolution of the numerous lawsuits that emerged. The Supreme Court finally decided the issue on 31 May 1960, when it ruled that Mississippi, Alabama, and Louisiana owned the rights to the offshore lands for a distance of three geographical miles, and Texas and Florida owned rights to tidelands within three marine leagues, from their coastline boundaries. In the case of Texas, the claim to special boundary limits had been recognized by Congress in the Treaty of Guadalupe Hidalgo of 1848, which ended the Mexican–American War. The ruling for Florida was based on congressional approval of Florida's claims when the state re-entered the Union after the American Civil War.

Although the other Gulf states objected to what they considered preferential treatment for Florida and Texas, no new legislation resulted. In 1963, the United States Department of Justice settled the last of the tidelands controversies by ruling that the 1953 act gave control to the states of islands near the shore that were created after the states had been admitted to the Union.

See also
 Equal footing
 Offshore oil and gas in the United States
 Outer Continental Shelf
 Riparian zone
 Submerged Lands Act
 Territorial waters
 Waters of the United States

Sources
 Bartly, Ernest R. The Tidelands Oil Controversy: A Legal and Historical Analysis. Austin: University of Texas Press, 1953.
 Galloway, Thomas D., ed. The Newest Federalism: A New Framework for Coastal Issues. Wakefield, R.I.: Times Press, 1982.
 Marshall, Hubert R., and Betty Zisk. The Federal-State Struggle for Offshore Oil. Indianapolis, Ind.: Published for the Inter-university Case Program by Bobbs-Merrill, 1966.

References

Further reading 
 

Real property law
Equal footing doctrine
United States public land law